Rosa del Moral (born 9 April 1936) is a Mexican fencer. She competed in the women's individual and team foil events at the 1968 Summer Olympics.

References

External links
 

1936 births
Living people
Mexican female foil fencers
Olympic fencers of Mexico
Fencers at the 1968 Summer Olympics
Sportspeople from Michoacán
People from Pátzcuaro